John Francis Xavier Knasas (born 1948) is an American philosopher. He is a leading existential Thomist in the Neo-Thomist movement, best known for engaging such thinkers as Bernard Lonergan, Alasdair MacIntyre and Jeremy Wilkins in disputes over human cognition to affirm a Thomistic epistemology of direct realism and defending the thought of Jacques Maritain, Étienne Gilson and Fr. Joseph Owens.  He holds the Bishop Wendelin J. Nold Endowed Chair as Professor of Philosophy at the Center for Thomistic Studies at the University of St. Thomas in Houston and earned his doctorate at the University of Toronto, under the direction of Fr. Joseph Owens.

Bibliography

Books
 Jacques Maritain: The Man and His Metaphysics [1989]
 The Preface to Thomistic Metaphysics [1991]
 Thomistic Paper VI (Editor) [1994]
 Being and Some Twentieth Century Thomists [2003]
 Aquinas and the Cry of Rachel: Thomistic Reflections on the Problem of Evil (Washington DC: Catholic University of America Press, 2013).

Critical studies and reviews of Knasas' work
Thomistic existentialism and cosmological reasoning

Notes

External links
 Official Page
 Interview with Knasas on Thomism
 Article by Knasas on the Thomistic revival

1948 births
20th-century American non-fiction writers
20th-century American philosophers
20th-century essayists
21st-century American non-fiction writers
21st-century American philosophers
21st-century essayists
American male essayists
American male non-fiction writers
American Roman Catholics
Catholic philosophers
Epistemologists
Historians of philosophy
American historians of religion
Living people
Lonergan scholars
Metaphysicians
Ontologists
Philosophers of history
Philosophers of religion
Philosophy writers
20th-century American male writers
21st-century American male writers